Pavel Nedelkovski (Macedonian: Пaвeл Heдeлкoвcки; born 14 October 1976 in Skopje) is a Macedonian football manager and retired player.

Playing career
During his career he played for FK Vardar, FK Radnički Niš, FK Rabotnički, FK Belasica and FK Cementarnica 55.

At international level, he played for the Macedonia national under-21 football team.

Managerial career
Nedelkovski briefly took charge as main coach of FK Rabotnički in October 2011, becoming right afterwards assistant manager until 2014.

References

External sources
 Profile at Srbijafudbal. 
 Rabotnički 2000–01 squad at EUFO.de
 

1976 births
Living people
Footballers from Skopje
Association football defenders
Macedonian footballers
FK Vardar players
FK Rabotnički players
FK Radnički Niš players
FK Belasica players
FK Cementarnica 55 players
FK Metalurg Skopje players
Macedonian First Football League players
First League of Serbia and Montenegro players
Macedonian expatriate footballers
Expatriate footballers in Serbia and Montenegro
Macedonian expatriate sportspeople in Serbia and Montenegro
Macedonian football managers
FK Rabotnički managers